Travel Weekly Group Ltd is a UK publishing and events company serving the travel industry, principally travel agents, tour operators and other suppliers.

Its main brand is weekly business publication Travel Weekly and its associated online services, supplements, forums and award events.

Other brands include Travolution, a news provider for the digital travel industry; Aspire, a media brand for the luxury travel market; and the Globe Travel Awards.

Travel Weekly Group was established by entrepreneur Clive Jacobs, founder of car rental company Holiday Autos, in August 2009 when he acquired Travel Weekly and its associated brands from Reed Business Information.

In March 2014, it acquired Kingley Event Management, whose portfolio included several UK travel industry events.

Travel Weekly Group employs about 80 staff and is based in Victoria, London, UK.

It is part of Jacobs Media Group, whose other brands include The Caterer, which serves the hospitality industry; Connections, a networking community for the high-end travel sector; Atas, the Association of Touring & Adventure Suppliers; the Global Travel and Tourism Resilience Council; Global Travel Week, an annual travel trade event; and Connecting Travel, a Dubai-based multimedia platform serving the tourism industry in the Middle East. Jacobs Media Group promotes itself as "the global voice for the travel and hospitality industries".

Travel Weekly

Travel Weekly is a travel trade magazine printed in the United Kingdom. It provides news, analysis and destination articles for travel agents, tour operators and tourism employees about the UK outbound and domestic holiday and travel markets.

The weekly A4-sized magazine has an audited circulation of 14,703 and is published on Thursday. Lucy Huxley is editor-in-chief.

Travel Weekly brands
Travel Weekly is produced by Travel Weekly Group, part of Jacobs Media Group, Europe's largest B2B multimedia company for the travel and hospitality industries.

Other brands in the group include The Caterer, Aspire, Travolution, Connections, Connecting Travel, Global Travel Week, and the Global Travel and Tourism Resilience Council.

In April 2020, Jacobs Media Group was awarded a Queen's Award for Enterprise.

Events
Globe Travel Awards, held annually in January at the Grosvenor House Hotel, London
Travolution Awards and Summit
Agent Achievement Awards

History
Travel Weekly was first published in 1969 as Travel News. Jacobs Media Group founder and chairman Clive Jacobs acquired it from Reed Business Information in 2009.

Travel Weekly has a team of about 50 and is based in Victoria, London, UK.

References

External links 
Travel Weekly
Travolution
Bonito ms
Cruises & Ship Trave
Aspire Travel Club
We Are Connections
ATAS - Touring & Adventure
The Caterer

Magazine publishing companies of the United Kingdom
2009 establishments in England